The Fifth Empire (O Quinto Império – Ontem Como Hoje) is a 2004 Portuguese film directed by Manoel de Oliveira.

Cast
 Ricardo Trêpa as King Sebastian I of Portugal
 Luís Miguel Cintra as Simão, Sapateiro Santo
 Glória de Matos as Rainha D. Catarina
 Miguel Guilherme as Truões
 David Almeida as Truões

See also

Cinema of Portugal

References

External links
 

2004 drama films
2004 films
Films directed by Manoel de Oliveira
Portuguese drama films
2000s Portuguese-language films